The U.S. state of Washington has over  of state highways maintained by the Washington State Department of Transportation (WSDOT). The highway system is defined through acts by the state legislature and is encoded in the Revised Code of Washington as State Routes (SR). It was created in 1964 to replace an earlier numbering scheme and ratified by the state legislature in 1970. The system's 196 highways are almost entirely paved, with the exception of a gravel section on SR 165.

The state's Interstate and U.S. Highways are also defined as part of the state route system, but are omitted from this list.


State routes

Special routes

WSDOT does not maintain business routes, which are instead created and signed by local jurisdictions.

References

State routes